Parthenina  pagodula is a species of sea snail, a marine gastropod mollusk in the family Pyramidellidae, the pyrams and their allies.

References

 Higo, S. & Goto, Y. (1993) A Systematic List of Molluscan Shells from the Japanese Is. and the Adjacent Area. Elle Scientific Publications, Yao, Japan, xxii + 693 + 13 + 149 pp. 
 Higo, S., Callomon, P. & Goto, Y. (1999) Catalogue and Bibliography of the Marine Shell-Bearing Mollusca of Japan. Elle Scientific Publications, Yao, Japan, 749 pp.
 Okutani T., ed. (2000) Marine mollusks in Japan. Tokai University Press. 1173 pp. page(s): 727
 Liu J.Y. [Ruiyu] (ed.). (2008). Checklist of marine biota of China seas. China Science Press. 1267 pp.

External links
 To World Register of Marine Species

Pyramidellidae
Gastropods described in 1860